Kalkhuran Sheykh (also Romanized as Kalkhūrān Sheykh and Kalkhowrān Sheykh; also known as Kalkharān Sheykh, Sheykh Kalkharān, Kalkhowrān ‘Olyā, and Kalkhūrān) is a village in Kalkharan Rural District, in the Central District of Ardabil County, Ardabil Province, Iran. At the 2006 census, its population was 3,069 in 794 families.

References 

Towns and villages in Ardabil County